LBE could refer to:

 The London Borough of Ealing
 The London Borough of Enfield
 Lead-bismuth eutectic
 Arnold Palmer Regional Airport
 Pratt-Read LBE
 Lübeck-Büchen Railway Company
 LBE Nos. 1 to 3
 ISO 639-3 code for the Lak language
Landing Barge, Emergency repair used in WW2